The 2018 Scottish Cup Final was the 133rd final of the Scottish Cup and the final of the 2017–18 Scottish Cup, the most prestigious knockout football competition in Scotland. The match took place at Hampden Park on 19 May 2018 and was contested by Celtic and Motherwell.

The fixture was a repeat of the finals in 1931, 1933, 1951 and 2011, all of which were won by Celtic. It was also a repeat of the League Cup final earlier in the same season, which Celtic won 2–0.

Celtic completed a successive domestic treble ("double treble"), a feat which had not previously been achieved in Scottish football.

Route to the final

Match

Summary
Callum McGregor opened the scoring for Celtic after 11 minutes with a right foot half volley from the edge of the penalty area into the left corner of the net after the ball broke to him. 	
Olivier Ntcham made it 2-0 after 25 minutes with a low right foot finish to the left corner of the net after a pass from Moussa Dembélé.

Details

Match rules
 90 minutes
 30 minutes of extra time if necessary
 Penalty shoot-out if scores still level
 Seven named substitutes
 Maximum of three substitutions in normal time (a fourth substitution may be made in extra time)

References 

Scottish Cup Finals
Scottish Cup Final 2018
Scottish Cup Final 2018
Scottish Cup Final
Scottish Cup Final 2018
Scottish Cup Final 2018
Scottish Cup Final